Métal hurlant (literal translation: "Howling Metal," "Screaming Metal") is a French comics anthology of science fiction and horror comics stories. Originally created in 1974, the anthologies ceased publication in 1987, but revived between 2002 and 2004 in multilingual editions, and then again in 2020.

History
Métal hurlant, in English "Howling Metal", was created in December 1974 by comics artists Jean Giraud (better known as Mœbius) and Philippe Druillet together with journalist-writer Jean-Pierre Dionnet and financial director Bernard Farkas. The four were collectively known as "Les Humanoïdes Associés" (United Humanoids), which became the name of the publishing house releasing Métal hurlant. Content from Metal Hurlant was republished in English in the United States by National Lampoon under the title Heavy Metal. It was published in Germany under the title Schwermetall.

The magazine was originally released quarterly; it consisted of 68 pages, of which only 16 were in colour. Contributors included Moebius and Druillet, depicting such characters as Arzach and Lone Sloane. Later issues featured Richard Corben, Alejandro Jodorowsky, Enki Bilal, Caza, Serge Clerc, Alain Voss, Berni Wrightson, Nicole Claveloux, Milo Manara, Frank Margerin, Masse, Chantal Montellier, and many others.

It became bi-monthly with #7 and monthly with #9. Apart from comics, the magazine contained articles about science fiction books and movies, as well as music and videogame reviews. Métal hurlant, emphasising complex graphics, cinematic imagery and surreal storylines, was highly influential throughout the world as one of the first mature expressions of "adult" comic book making. It ceased publication in July 1987.

2002 revival
Métal hurlant began publishing again in July 2002 by Humanoids Publishing, with a French, English, Spanish and Portuguese version, under the French name. As a "two-headed", transatlantic (France-US) magazine, led by Fabrice Giger in Los Angeles, it published original short stories, sometimes related to existing or to be published comic books. Its aim was to discover young creators and promote the products from the publisher. This incarnation of the magazine ceased publication with issue #14, dated November/December 2004.

2021 revival
Vincent Bernière launched Metal Hurlant for 2021. This third volume of Métal Hurlant was launched via crowdfunding, on the KissKissBankBank platform. The first issue was published 29 September, with four issues a year (two with new content and two with classic content) planned. The third issue was published in March 2022, and included the story "Aquarium" by French author Léo Quievreux.

A Polish edition of the relaunched magazine, overlapping with reprints of classic issues, premiered in December 2021.

Stories
Stories that were published in the original Métal hurlant include:
 Arzach
 Exterminator 17
 Fragile by Stefano Raffaele
 Jeremiah
 Lone Sloane
 Milady 3000
 The Zombies That Ate the World by Guy Davis and Jerry Frissen
 The Long Tomorrow by Dan O'Bannon and Jean Giraud
 1996 by Chantal Montellier

Adaptations
Some of their titles have gone on to be adapted into other media.

In November 2009, a film based on Stefano Raffaele's Fragile was in development.

A live-action TV series based on Métal hurlant titled Métal Hurlant Chronicles was in the production in France. A French-United Kingdom co-production, the series consists of 12 half-hour episodes over two seasons. Featured actors include Rutger Hauer, Scott Adkins, Michael Jai White, Karl E. Landler, Joe Flanigan, David Belle, Matt Mullins and James Marsters. In the United States, the series began airing on the Syfy Channel on 14 April 2014.

Notes

References

 Métal Hurlant at BDoubliées 
 Métal Hurlant at Bedetheque 
 Métal Hurlant (Hors Série) at Bedetheque

External links
 Metal Hurlant at Humanoids Publishing
 2002+ checklist

1974 establishments in France
Comics magazines published in France
French science fiction
Magazines established in 1974
Magazines disestablished in 1987
Magazines established in 2002
Magazines disestablished in 2004
 
1974 comics debuts
1987 comics endings
2002 comics debuts
2004 comics endings
Defunct magazines published in France
Defunct comics
Magazines about comics
Comics adapted into television series
Monthly magazines published in France
French-language magazines